The following is a list of mayors of Kigali, Rwanda.

 Francois Karera, 1975–1990
 Tharcisse Renzaho, 1990–1994
 Rose Kabuye, 1994–1997
 Protais Musoni, 1997–1999
 Marc Kabandana, 1999–2001
 Theoneste Mutsindashyaka, 2001–2006
 Aisa Kirabo Kacyira, 2006–2011
 Fidèle Ndayisaba, 2011–2016 
 Monique Mukaruliza, 2016
 Pascal Nyamulinda, 2017 – May 2018
 Chantal Rwakazina, May 2018 – August 2019
Pudence Rubingisa, August 2019 – present

See also
 Kigali history and timeline

References

kigali
Rwanda politics-related lists
People from Kigali